John Frederick (25 April 1625 in Herzberg am Harz – 18 December 1679 in Augsburg) was duke of Brunswick-Lüneburg. He ruled over the Principality of Calenberg, a subdivision of the duchy, from 1665 until his death.

The third son of George, Duke of Brunswick-Lüneburg, John converted to the Roman Catholic Church, the only member of his family to do so, in 1651, as a result of a visit while in Italy to Saint Joseph of Cupertino. He received Calenberg when his elder brother George William inherited the Principality of Lüneburg. In 1666, he had a palace built in Herrenhausen near Hanover that was inspired by the Palace of Versailles and is famous for its gardens, the Herrenhausen Gardens.

In 1667, he employed as his master builder the Venetian architect Girolamo Sartorio, who designed many buildings in the town, including the Neustädter Kirche, and was instrumental in the expansion of the Herrenhausen Gardens.

In 1676, John Frederick employed Gottfried Wilhelm Leibniz as Privy Councillor and librarian of the important ducal library. Thus began Leibniz's 40-year association with the House of Hanover, which resulted in three generations of Hanovers being patrons to one of the most eminent philosophers and mathematicians of Europe.

Children

John Frederick married Benedicta Henrietta of the Palatinate (14 March 1652 – 12 August 1730), daughter of Edward, Count Palatine of Simmern and Anna Gonzaga, on 30 November 1668. They had four daughters:
 Charlotte Felicitas (8 March 1671 – 29 September 1710), married Rinaldo III, Duke of Modena
 Wilhelmina Amalia (1673 – 10 April 1742), married Joseph I, Holy Roman Emperor

Ancestry

Notes

References
 Allgemeine Deutsche Biographie, vol. 14, p. 177-181
 At the House of Welf site

1625 births
1679 deaths
People from Herzberg am Harz
German Roman Catholics
Converts to Roman Catholicism from Lutheranism
Princes of Calenberg
New House of Lüneburg
People from Grubenhagen
Roman Catholic monarchs
Burials at Berggarten Mausoleum, Herrenhausen (Hanover)